KNIN-TV (channel 9) is a television station licensed to Caldwell, Idaho, United States, serving as the Fox affiliate for the Boise area. It is owned by Gray Television, which maintains a shared services agreement (SSA) with the E. W. Scripps Company, owner of Nampa-licensed ABC affiliate KIVI-TV (channel 6), for the provision of certain services. Both stations share studios on East Chisholm Drive in Nampa along I-84/US 30/SH-55, while KNIN-TV's transmitter is located at the Bogus Basin ski area summit in unincorporated Boise County.

The station signed on at the end of 1992 as KHDT-TV. Originally airing home shopping programming, the station raised its profile by affiliating with UPN in 1995. It then became a full-time general-entertainment station the next year under new KNIN-TV call letters. Journal Broadcast Group, the then-owner of KIVI, acquired KNIN-TV in 2009 after appealing an FCC decision denying the purchase. Two years later, in the wake of a dispute between Fox and its then-affiliate, KTRV-TV, KNIN-TV replaced it as Boise's Fox affiliate. When Scripps acquired Journal in 2015, it could not acquire the KNIN-TV license, which was transferred to Raycom Media and later Gray Television while Scripps continued to provide services and local news programming. Gray has filed to trade the station to Marquee Broadcasting in exchange for television properties serving Macon, Georgia.

History

Early years
The station signed on December 28, 1992, as KHDT-TV, airing an analog signal on VHF channel 9. The launch allowed KHDT-TV to beat a year-end deadline to get on the air. It was originally owned by William Schuyler, who had put several television stations on the air in California, and was affiliated with the Home Shopping Network (HSN). On January 16, 1995, it became a charter UPN affiliate while continuing to air HSN from midnight to 6 p.m.

Schuyler sold KHDT-TV in 1996 to Boise Broadcasting, a division of Las Vegas-based Lambert Television. On September 2, 1996, the station dropped most of its home shopping programming for a general-entertainment independent lineup and became a dual affiliate of UPN and The WB. In commercials, the station's mascot was Boise DJ Brad Rowen under the alias "Rot Wyler", fitting with the "canine" pronunciation of the call sign; the station's website called him "Idaho's most misunderstood no news anchor" and promised, "If there's news in the Treasure Valley, be assured K9-TV will miss it!" The station was operated by Banks Broadcasting by 2000; Banks then purchased the station in 2001.

In the wake of the 2006 merger of UPN and The WB into The CW, KNIN-TV became the network's Boise affiliate.

Journal ownership and Fox affiliation
On July 1, 2008, Banks Broadcasting announced that it had agreed to sell KNIN to Journal Communications (owner of KIVI and four FM and two AM radio stations), creating Boise's first television duopoly and marking Banks's exit from the television business. However, it was unclear how Journal was going to justify the purchase to the FCC because Boise had too few unique station owners to permit a duopoly. While the Federal Communications Commission (FCC) initially rejected the application on November 10, 2008, stating Journal had not successfully shown that KNIN-TV was a "failing station" that could be rolled into a duopoly, shortly afterward, Banks Broadcasting filed an appeal, and on January 16, 2009, the FCC reversed its decision, allowing the deal to go through. The purchase closed on April 24; some KNIN-TV employees were laid off after the sale.

After a dispute involving affiliation fees, Fox announced in May 2011 that it would discontinue its affiliation with KTRV-TV (channel 12) and move its programming to KNIN-TV in September. It was one of two affiliation changes for the same reason made by Fox at that time, along with another in Evansville, Indiana. The CW moved to CW Plus programming moved to KYUU-LP and a subchannel of CBS affiliate KBOI-TV. 

On July 30, 2014, it was announced that the E. W. Scripps Company would acquire Journal Communications in an all-stock transaction and then spin off both companies' print assets. Originally, KNIN-TV, KIVI-TV and five radio stations were not included in the merger; in September, Journal filed to transfer these stations to Journal/Scripps Divestiture Trust (with Kiel Media Group as trustee). The merger was completed on April 1, 2015, and Kiel Media Group assumed the operations of the license, Scripps retained KIVI-TV and the radio stations. On May 7, 2015, Raycom Media agreed to purchase KNIN-TV for $14.5 million; Scripps then entered into a shared services agreement that will allow KIVI to continue to provide services to KNIN-TV, the second such agreement between Scripps and Raycom after one in West Palm Beach, Florida. The sale was completed on October 1, 2015. Raycom Media merged with Gray Television in January 2019.

Sale to Marquee Broadcasting
Gray Television announced on February 15, 2023, that it would trade KNIN-TV to Marquee Broadcasting in exchange for Marquee's WPGA-TV serving the Macon, Georgia, market. The station swap would complete a key objective for Gray by giving it a full-service station in every market in Georgia, the company's home state.

Newscasts

Following Journal's acquisition of KNIN-TV, the station began airing a half-hour local newscast at 9 p.m. from the KIVI-TV newsroom. The newscast was extended to a full hour and to seven nights a week when KNIN-TV became the Fox affiliate in September 2011; Journal expanded the KIVI-TV news operation with 10 new staffers. An hour-long extension to KIVI-TV's morning show, Good Morning Idaho, was added in August 2014.

Technical information

Subchannels
The station's digital signal is multiplexed:

Analog-to-digital conversion
KNIN-TV shut down its analog signal, over VHF channel 9, on June 12, 2009, the official date in which full-power television stations in the United States transitioned from analog to digital broadcasts under federal mandate. The station's digital signal remained on its pre-transition VHF channel 10, using virtual channel 9.

References

External links

KIVITV.com - Official KIVI-TV Website

MeTV affiliates
Circle (TV network) affiliates
Television channels and stations established in 1992
NIN-TV
E. W. Scripps Company television stations
Gray Television
Caldwell, Idaho
1992 establishments in Idaho
Fox network affiliates